Rolf Pettersson (born 11 December 1944) is a Swedish orienteering competitor. He is a four-time Relay World Champion as a member of the winning Swedish team in 1972, 1974, 1976 and 1979, and was runner-up in 1978. He won silver in the Individual World Championship in 1976.

References

1944 births
Living people
Swedish orienteers
Male orienteers
Foot orienteers
World Orienteering Championships medalists